Carl Brettschneider (December 2, 1931 – November 26, 2014) was an All-Pro linebacker in the NFL. He played for the Chicago Cardinals and Detroit Lions.

References

1931 births
2014 deaths
American football linebackers
Chicago Cardinals players
Detroit Lions players
Iowa State Cyclones football players
Sportspeople from Kane County, Illinois
People from West Dundee, Illinois